RVNG couture (pronounced /rɪˈvendʒ/) is a luxury fashion house producing couture garments and ready-to-wear womenswear. The brand was founded in 2018 by head designer/ couturier Jordan Stewart, RVNG is a New York Fashion Week runway brand, showcasing annually with NYFW & showing Paris Fashion Week  as well as CFDA runway360. RVNG is   worn by Oprah Winfrey , Nobility - Baroness Marina Von Lion, Cristine Quinn, Leona Lewis,  Wynonna Judd, Paris Hilton, Connie Britton, Quinta Brunson, Beyoncé, Nicole Kidman, Kelsea Ballerrini.  RVNG couture gowns are adored and worn on all major red carpets for the Academy Awards, Golden Globes, Emmys and Juno Awards, Oscars, Cannes film festival.   

RVNG is adored for the stage & special moments.

Background 
Head designer Jordan Stewart got her start in the fashion business in 2008 with her own high-end clothing boutiques where she sourced clothing from different luxury brands. Stewart's family has a long history in fashion, with her great grandmother being a master European dressmaker and her grandmother being a seamstress working for the Singer Corporation. In 2014, Stewart decided to branch out into designing her own pieces thanks to the expertise that had been passed down through her family, and due to her experience working with luxury brands.

Awards and honours 
In 2021, RVNG was nominated for the Canadian Arts and Fashion Award's Swarovski Award for Emerging Talent.

References

External links 

 Official Website

Fashion
Designers
Canadian designers